Monroe County is a county in the Commonwealth of Pennsylvania. It is located in Northeastern Pennsylvania. As of the 2020 census, the population was 168,327. Its county seat is Stroudsburg. The county was formed from sections of Northampton and Pike counties on April 1, 1836.

Named in honor of James Monroe, the fifth president of the United States, the county is located in Northeastern Pennsylvania, along its border with New Jersey. Monroe County is coterminous with the East Stroudsburg, PA Metropolitan Statistical Area. It also borders the Wyoming Valley, the Lehigh Valley, and has connections to the Delaware Valley and the Tri-State Area as part of New York City's Designated Media Market, but also receiving media from the Scranton/Wilkes-Barre and Philadelphia areas.

The county is home to East Stroudsburg University. For many recent decades, Monroe County was one of the fastest-growing counties in the state of Pennsylvania, partially due to tourism, and partially due to transplants from the New York City Area desiring a lower cost of living while still being close enough to commute to work in the city. The population increased by over 70% from 1990 to 2010, and the commercial and retail sectors expanded significantly, although population growth has since slowed.

The Lehigh River, a  tributary of the Delaware River, flows through Monroe County.

Geography
It has a humid continental climate (Dfb except for some Dfa in the southern and SE tiers) and the hardiness zone ranges from 5a to 6b. The area code is 570, except in the southwest where the Kunkletown exchange uses 610.

Adjacent counties

 Wayne County (north)
 Pike County (northeast)
 Sussex County, New Jersey (northeast)
 Warren County, New Jersey (east)
 Northampton County (south)
 Carbon County (west)
 Luzerne County (northwest)
 Lackawanna County (northwest)

National protected areas
 Cherry Valley National Wildlife Refuge
 Delaware Water Gap National Recreation Area (part)
 Middle Delaware National Scenic River (part)

Demographics

As of the census of 2010, there were 169,842 people, 49,454 households, and 36,447 families residing in the county. There were 67,581 housing units at an average density of 111 per square mile (43/km2). The racial makeup of the county was 70.5% White Non-Hispanic, 13.2% Black or African American, 0.3% Native American, 2.1% Asian, 0.03% Pacific Islander, 4.3% from other races, and 2.9% from two or more races. 13.1% of the population were Hispanic or Latino of any race. 19.9% were of German, 16.8% Irish, 14.5% Italian, 8.8% Pennsylvania German, 5.4% Polish, 5.1% American and 5.1% English ancestry.

There were 49,454 households, out of which 36.20% had children under the age of 18 living with them, 60.70% were married couples living together, 8.80% had a female householder with no husband present, and 26.30% were non-families. 20.20% of all households were made up of individuals, and 7.80% had someone living alone who was 65 years of age or older.  The average household size was 2.73 and the average family size was 3.16.

As of the end of 2021, the median value of all homes in Monroe County was $210,972, an increase of 13% since the prior year.

In the county, the population was spread out, with 26.80% under the age of 18, 8.60% from 18 to 24, 28.80% from 25 to 44, 23.50% from 45 to 64, and 12.30% who were 65 years of age or older.  The median age was 37 years. For every 100 females there were 97.60 males.  For every 100 females age 18 and over, there were 94.40 males.

2020 Census

Metropolitan Statistical Area

The U.S. Office of Management and Budget has designated Monroe County as the East Stroudsburg, PA Metropolitan Statistical Area. As of the 2010 census the Metro area had a population of 169,842.  The area ranks 12th most populous in the state of Pennsylvania and ranks 244th most populous in the United States.

The U.S. Office of Management and Budget has also designated Monroe County as part of the larger New York–Newark, NY–NJ–CT–PA Combined Statistical Area. The larger combined area once consisted of the Pennsylvania Counties in the Lehigh Valley, which are Carbon, Lehigh and Northampton, but as of 2018, only Monroe County and Pike County are the only two counties in Pennsylvania grouped with New York's CSA. As of the 2010 US Census, the population of the CSA was 23,076,664, making it the most populous Combined Statistical Area in the United States.

Politics

For much of the second half of the 20th century, Monroe County was a Republican stronghold. However, in recent years, party registration has leaned toward the Democratic Party, a result of continued migration to the county by former New York City residents, many of whom are Democrats.  While in the 2004 U.S. presidential election the county was carried by Republican George W. Bush by a margin of four votes, beginning with the first campaign (2008) of Barack Obama, Democratic candidates carried Monroe County. In that election Obama carried the county by a 17-point margin, 58% to 41%–the first Democrat to win the county since 1964, and only the second since 1940. The other three 2008 statewide Democratic candidates also carried the county handily. Additionally, the Democratic presidential candidates carried the county in 2012 (Obama), 2016 (Hillary Clinton), and 2020 (Joe Biden).

|}

As of January 9, 2023, there are 110,966 registered voters in Monroe County.
 Democratic: 49,724 (44.8%)
 Republican: 39,072 (35.2%)
 Independent: 16,190 (14.6%)
 Minor Party: 5,980 (5.4%)

County commissioners
 Sharon Laverdure (D), Chair
 John Moyer (R), Vice Chair
 John Christy (D), Commissioner

Other county offices
 Controller, Marlo Merhige, Republican
 Coroner, Thomas Yanac, Democratic
 District Attorney, E. David Christine, Jr., Republican
 Prothonotary, George Warden, Republican
 Recorder of Deeds and Register of Wills, Josephine Ferro, Republican
 Sheriff, Ken Morris, Republican
 Treasurer, Theresa Johnson, Republican

State Representatives
 Maureen Madden, Democratic, 115th district
 Jack Rader, Jr., Republican, 176th district
 Tarah Probst, Democrat, 189th district

State Senator
 Rosemary Brown, Republican, 40th district

United States Representatives
 Susan Wild, Democratic, Pennsylvania's 7th congressional district
 Matthew Cartwright, Democratic, Pennsylvania's 8th congressional district

United States Senators
 Robert P. Casey, Jr., Democratic
 John Fetterman, Democratic

Governor
 Josh Shapiro, Democratic

Transportation
Public transportation throughout the county is provided by the Monroe County Transit Authority (MCTA), known as the "Pocono Pony". MCTA operates a fixed route bus system and a paratransit curb to curb service for eligible populations.

New Jersey Transit is restoring train tracks in northwestern New Jersey along the Lackawanna Cut-off. This would, potentially, also involve the train to go to Scranton from Hoboken, which would go through the Poconos, marking the first time since the early 1970s when the Erie Lackawanna Railroad stopped running daily trains through the area.

Major highways

Education

Colleges and universities
 East Stroudsburg University of Pennsylvania
 Northampton Community College (Monroe Campus)

Public school districts
 East Stroudsburg Area School District
 Pleasant Valley School District
 Pocono Mountain School District
 Stroudsburg Area School District

Charter schools
 Evergreen Community Charter School, Cresco

Technology schools
Monroe Career and Technical Institute, Bartonsville

Private schools
 Art Learning Center, East Stroudsburg
 Character Builders Christian Academy, Pocono Pines
 East Stroudsburg Christian Academy, East Stroudsburg **closed in 2012**
 Monsignor McHugh School, Cresco **closed in 2020**
 Notre Dame Elementary School, East Stroudsburg
 Notre Dame High School, East Stroudsburg
 Pocono Central Catholic High School, Cresco **closed in 1988**
 St Pauls Lutheran Pre-School, East Stroudsburg
 Stroudsburg 7th Day Adventists School, Stroudsburg
 Summit School of the Poconos, Stroudsburg
 Triumphant & Excellence Academy 1, East Stroudsburg
 Triumphant & Excellence Academy 2 TEA Institute, Tobyhanna
 Triumphant Living Heritage, Marshalls Creek
 Victory Baptist Christian School, Brodheadsville

Private schools are as reported in EdNA school database maintained and published by the Pennsylvania Department of Education, 2011

Industry
The Tobyhanna Army Depot, the U.S. Department of Defense's largest center for the repair and fabrication of electronic systems, is located in Monroe County. It was identified in 2004 as the largest employer in northeastern Pennsylvania.

Parks and trails

The county also has Pennsylvania state parks, such as Big Pocono State Park and parts of the Delaware State Forest, Gouldsboro State Park, and Tobyhanna State Park.

The Appalachian Trail passes through Monroe County. David Pierce wrote in the Pocono Record, "The  public footpath—from Georgia to Maine—has a particularly scenic but rugged section that straddles Monroe County’s southern border..." He stated that "trail hiking has long been an integral part of Monroe County's identity..."

During the Revolutionary War in 1779, General John Sullivan marched his troops through Monroe County on their expedition to fight the Iroquois tribe in New York State.  There are many historical markers identifying the Sullivan Trail.  Sergeant Moses Fellows of the Third New Hampshire Regiment described the area as "...very poor & Barren and I think as never will Be Settled.”

It's one of the most extensive public access trail systems in Monroe County.

Dixon Miller State Forest – this is an extensive trail system in Long Pond, PA.

Cherry Valley National Wildlife Refuge has elaborate Trail systems, and public access.

Mount Wismer is a scenic hike in Monroe County.

Nothstein Preserve is an elaborate wooded trail system in the Poconos 

Chestnut mountain nature preserve is a many acre preserve atop the Plateau.

Resorts

Two of the earliest Pocono resorts, founded by rival factions of the Philadelphia Quaker community, were located in Monroe County: Inn at Buck Hill Falls (1901) and Pocono Manor (1902).  These resorts did not allow liquor or dancing, and evening dress was discouraged. The Quakers "brought a quiet, unostentatious style to the region," but their hotels later developed from religious retreats into "luxurious mountain resorts." Buck Hill's stone facade became a model for close to 300 stately stone-and-shingle homes in the region. Pocono Manor offers sweeping vistas of the eastern and western Pocono region and has been referred to as the "Grand Lady of the Mountains." Buck Hill closed in 1990 and the Inn at Pocono Manor was mostly destroyed by fire in 2019.

Skytop Lodge, built in 1928, is also located in Monroe County and has been described as a "Dutch Colonial-style manor house." Designed in reaction to the Quaker resorts, it had a dance floor and served liquor in a basement bar.

The Buckwood Inn opened in Monroe County in 1911 and included the first golf course to be designed by renowned golf architect A. W. Tillinghast. Bandleader Fred Waring purchased the resort in 1943, renamed it the Shawnee Inn, and broadcast his radio shows from there. The Shawnee Inn is a Spanish colonial revival building with white-Moorish architecture and Spanish tiled roofs, and it was identified in the 1990s as the only resort on the banks of the Delaware River.

Mount Airy Lodge, which expanded from an eight-room inn into the largest Pocono resort, was located in Monroe County.  It heavily advertised in the New York media market with the catchy jingle, "Beautiful Mount Airy Lodge."  Headliners, such as Bob Hope, Milton Berle, and Connie Francis, performed in the Crystal Room, Mount Airy's 2,000-seat theater.  Comedian Mickey Freeman said, "The food was lousy, but it was a legalized orgy."   The  resort's heyday was in the 1960s and 1970s before closing in 2001.  In October 2007 the Mount Airy Casino Resort opened on the site.

As of July 2015, there were three resorts in Monroe County with indoor water parks: Great Wolf Lodge, Aquatopia at Camelback Resort, and Kalahari Resort.

Communities

Under Pennsylvania law, there are four types of incorporated municipalities: cities, boroughs, townships, and, in at most two cases, towns. The following cities, boroughs and townships are located in Monroe County:

Boroughs
 Delaware Water Gap
 East Stroudsburg
 Mount Pocono
 Stroudsburg (county seat)

Townships

 Barrett
 Chestnuthill
 Coolbaugh
 Eldred
 Hamilton
 Jackson
 Middle Smithfield
 Paradise
 Pocono
 Polk
 Price
 Ross
 Smithfield
 Stroud
 Tobyhanna
 Tunkhannock

Census-designated places
Census-designated places are geographical areas designated by the U.S. Census Bureau for the purposes of compiling demographic data. They are not actual jurisdictions under Pennsylvania law.

 Arlington Heights
 Brodheadsville
 Effort
 Emerald Lakes
 Gouldsboro
 Indian Mountain Lake (partially in Carbon County)
 Mountainhome
 Penn Estates
 Pocono Pines
 Saw Creek (mostly in Pike County)
 Saylorsburg
 Sierra View
 Sun Valley

Unincorporated communities

 Analomink
 Appenzell
 Bartonsville
 Blakeslee
 Bossardsville
 Canadensis
 Cherry Valley
 Cresco
 Hamilton Square
 Henryville
 Jonas
 Kellersville
 Kemmertown
 Kresgeville
 Kunkletown
 Long Pond
 Marshalls Creek
 McIlhaney
 McMichaels
 Meistertown
 Neola
 Paradise Valley
 Pocono Manor
 Pocono Summit
 Reeders
 Sciota
 Scotrun
 Shawnee on Delaware
 Skytop
 Snydersvillle
 South Stroudsburg
 Swiftwater
 Tannersville
 Tobyhanna

Population ranking
The population ranking of the following table is based on the 2010 census of Monroe County.

† county seat

Watersheds

Monroe County has three major watersheds, all of which are part of the Delaware River Watershed.

The Brodhead Watershed, the Aquashicola Pohopoco Watershed, and the Tobyhanna Tunkhannock Watershed.

Climate

Pocono Plateau Region
According to the Trewartha climate classification system, the higher elevation Pocono Plateau Region of Monroe County has a Temperate Continental climate (Dc) with warm summers (b), cold winters (o) and year-around precipitation (Dcbo). Dcbo climates are characterized by at least one month having an average mean temperature ≤ , four to seven months with an average mean temperature ≥ , all months with an average mean temperature <  and no significant precipitation difference between seasons. Although most summer days are comfortably humid on the Pocono Plateau, episodes of heat and high humidity can occur with heat index values > . July is the peak month for thunderstorm activity which correlates with the average warmest month of the year. Episodes of extreme cold and wind can occur with wind chill values < . The average snowiest month is January which correlates with the average coldest month of the year. Ice storms and large snowstorms depositing ≥  of snow occur nearly every year, particularly during nor’easters from December through March.

Ridge and Valley Region

According to the Trewartha climate classification system, the lower elevation Ridge and Valley section of Monroe County has a Temperate Continental climate (Dc) with hot summers (a), cold winters (o) and year-around precipitation (Dcao). Dcao climates are characterized by at least one month having an average mean temperature ≤ , four to seven months with an average mean temperature ≥ , at least one month with an average mean temperature ≥  and no significant precipitation difference between seasons. Although most summer days are slightly humid in the Ridge and Valley, episodes of heat and high humidity can occur with heat index values > . July is the peak month for thunderstorm activity which correlates with the average warmest month of the year. The average wettest month is September which correlates with tropical storm remnants during the peak of the Atlantic hurricane season. Episodes of extreme cold and wind can occur with wind chill values < . The average snowiest month is January which correlates with the average coldest month of the year. Ice storms and large snowstorms depositing ≥  of snow occur once every couple of years, particularly during nor’easters from December through March.

Ecology

Long Pond

Long Pond is an inland freshwater wetland.

The Nature Conservancy's Hauser Nature Center is a destination for hiking and ecological tourism in Long Pond.

Pocono Plateau Region
According to the A. W. Kuchler U.S. potential natural vegetation types, the higher elevation Pocono Plateau Region of Monroe County would have a dominant vegetation type of Northern Hardwood (106) with a dominant vegetation form of Northern hardwood forest (26). The peak spring bloom typically occurs in early-May and peak fall color usually occurs in early-October.

Ridge and Valley Region

According to the A. W. Kuchler U.S. potential natural vegetation types, the lower elevation Ridge and Valley section of Monroe County would have a dominant vegetation type of Appalachian Oak (104) with a dominant vegetation form of Eastern Hardwood Forest (25). The peak spring bloom typically occurs in late-April and peak fall color usually occurs in mid-October.

Glacial Till Barrens

Located in the vicinity of Big Pocono State Park, Blakeslee, and Long pond.  The Glacial Till Barrens are best exeplified by the Long Pond Conservation Easement.  Which has public access trail systems.  Glacial Till Barrens are found in Dixon Miller State Forest, and within the Bethlehem Authority property.   One of the only such ecosystems in the entire state of Pennsylvania.  The Glacial till barrens are mesic (meaning moist), and yet have species that are more typical of far northern climates.

See also
 National Register of Historic Places listings in Monroe County, Pennsylvania

References

 
1836 establishments in Pennsylvania
Populated places established in 1836
Pocono Mountains
Counties of Appalachia
Counties in the New York metropolitan area